Woodville is a census-designated place (CDP) in Tulare County, California, United States. The population was 1,740 at the 2010 census, up from 1,678 at the 2000 census.

Geography
Woodville is located at  (36.091847, -119.200116).

Demographics

2010
The 2010 United States Census reported that Woodville had a population of 1,740. The racial makeup of Woodville was 1,345 (77.3%) White, 1 (0.1%) African American, 31 (1.8%) Native American, 6 (0.3%) Asian, 0 (0.0%) Pacific Islander, 324 (18.6%) from other races, and 33 (1.9%) from two or more races. Hispanic or Latino of any race were 1,545 persons (88.8%).

The Census reported that 1,740 people (100% of the population) lived in households, 0 (0%) lived in non-institutionalized group quarters, and 0 (0%) were institutionalized.

There were 409 households, out of which 269 (65.8%) had children under the age of 18 living in them, 246 (60.1%) were opposite-sex married couples living together, 59 (14.4%) had a female householder with no husband present, 62 (15.2%) had a male householder with no wife present.  There were 40 (9.8%) unmarried opposite-sex partnerships, and 5 (1.2%) same-sex married couples or partnerships. 32 households (7.8%) were made up of individuals, and 9 (2.2%) had someone living alone who was 65 years of age or older. The average household size was 4.25.  There were 367 families (89.7% of all households); the average family size was 4.34.

The population was spread out, with 624 people (35.9%) under the age of 18, 215 people (12.4%) aged 18 to 24, 477 people (27.4%) aged 25 to 44, 312 people (17.9%) aged 45 to 64, and 112 people (6.4%) who were 65 years of age or older.  The median age was 26.5 years. For every 100 females, there were 117.8 males.  For every 100 females age 18 and over, there were 120.1 males.

The homeowner vacancy rate was 0%; the rental vacancy rate was 3.1%.  916 people (52.6% of the population) lived in owner-occupied housing units and 824 people (47.4%) lived in rental housing units.

2000
As of the census of 2000, there were 1,678 people, 371 households, and 316 families residing in the CDP. The racial makeup of the CDP was 27.23% White, 0.06% African American, 1.49% Native American, 0.06% Asian, 67.16% from other races, and 3.99% from two or more races. Hispanic or Latino of any race were 82.54% of the population.

There were 371 households, out of which 52.8% had children under the age of 18 living with them, 60.4% were married couples living together, 14.8% had a female householder with no husband present, and 14.6% were non-families. 12.7% of all households were made up of individuals, and 6.7% had someone living alone who was 65 years of age or older.  The average household size was 4.51 and the average family size was 4.87.

In the CDP, the population was spread out, with 39.9% under the age of 18, 13.8% from 18 to 24, 25.8% from 25 to 44, 13.8% from 45 to 64, and 6.8% who were 65 years of age or older.  The median age was 23 years. For every 100 females, there were 116.0 males.  For every 100 females age 18 and over, there were 124.7 males.

The median income for a household in the CDP was $25,474, and the median income for a family was $22,946. Males had a median income of $16,917 versus $14,821 for females. The per capita income for the CDP was $6,824.  About 33.6% of families and 36.5% of the population were below the poverty line, including 37.9% of those under age 18 and 25.0% of those age 65 or over.

The languages spoken at home were Spanish 81.5%, English 17.46%, and Portuguese 1.02%.

Government

In the United States House of Representatives, Woodville is in

Notable person
Rance Mulliniks (1956-   ) Major League Baseball Player

Notes

Census-designated places in Tulare County, California
Census-designated places in California